The 1994 French Open was a tennis tournament that took place on the outdoor clay courts at the Stade Roland Garros in Paris, France. The tournament was held from 23 May until 5 June. It was the 98th staging of the French Open, and the second Grand Slam tennis event of 1994.

Seniors

Men's singles

 Sergi Bruguera defeated  Alberto Berasategui, 6–3, 7–5, 2–6, 6–1
It was Bruguera's 1st title of the year, and his 12th overall. It was his 2nd (and last) career Grand Slam title, and his 2nd French Open title.

Women's singles

 Arantxa Sánchez Vicario defeated  Mary Pierce, 6–4, 6–4
It was Sanchez's 4th title of the year, and her 16th overall. It was her 2nd career Grand Slam title, and her 2nd French Open title.

Men's doubles

 Byron Black /  Jonathan Stark defeated  Jan Apell /  Jonas Björkman, 6–4, 7–6

Women's doubles

 Gigi Fernández /  Natalia Zvereva defeated  Lindsay Davenport /  Lisa Raymond, 6–2, 6–2

Mixed doubles

 Kristie Boogert /  Menno Oosting defeated  Larisa Savchenko-Neiland /  Andrei Olhovskiy, 7–5, 3–6, 7–5
This was Boogert's 1st career Grand Slam title.

Juniors

Boys' singles
 Jacobo Díaz defeated  Giorgio Galimberti, 6–3, 7–6

Girls' singles
 Martina Hingis defeated  Sonya Jeyaseelan, 6–3, 6–1

Boys' doubles
 Gustavo Kuerten /  Nicolás Lapentti defeated  Maxime Boyé /  Nicolas Escudé, 6–2, 6–4

Girls' doubles
 Martina Hingis /  Henrieta Nagyová defeated  Lenka Cenková /  Ludmila Richterová, 6–3, 6–2

Notes

External links
 French Open official website

 
1994 in French tennis
1994 in Paris